Irene of Larissa was the second wife and empress-consort (tsaritsa) of tsar Gavril Radomir of Bulgaria.

John Skylitzes reports Irene was a "beautiful captive from Larissa", and nothing else is known about her antecedents. Gavril Radomir married her around 999 after he had expelled his first Hungarian wife, who was pregnant at this time.

They had seven children, five sons and two daughters.

Gavril Radomir succeeded to the Bulgarian throne in 1014, but his reign was short. Skylitzes reports that Irene was murdered along with her husband by his cousin, Ivan Vladislav, who seized the throne in 1015. He also took steps to ensure his position and ordered the mutilation of their eldest son.

Sources
 История на българската държава през средните векове, Том I. История на Първото българско царство. Част II. От славянизацията на държавата до падането на Първото царство (852—1018). Васил Н. Златарски 4.Приемниците на цар Самуил и покорението на България от Василий II Българоубиец.
Runciman, Steven, The First Bulgarian Empire. 1930.
 John Skylitzes. Synopsis Historion , translated by Paul Stephenson.

Bulgarian consorts
10th-century births
1015 deaths
10th-century Byzantine women
10th-century Bulgarian women
11th-century Bulgarian women
People from Larissa
Cometopuli dynasty
Daughters of emperors